Joseph Michael Eichner (born October 9, 1991) is an American rugby league footballer who played professionally for the Toronto Wolfpack during their inaugural season in League 1. He currently plays for New York Freedom in the North American Rugby League where he was the first ever player signed by the newly formed club.

Early life 
A Geneva, Florida native, Eichner played baseball and attended Oviedo High School in his youth. He discovered rugby league in 2010 while attending the University of North Florida, and joined the Jacksonville Axemen of the USA Rugby League after graduating with his bachelor's degree in building science.

Playing career 
After attending a try-out in Tampa, Florida in October 2016, Eichner earned a contract with the Toronto Wolfpack in December 2016 following a twelve-day training camp held in Brighouse, West Yorkshire, England. He made his debut for the Wolfpack in their round 9 match against the Coventry Bears on June 3, 2017. On September 24, Eichner was named in the United States' 23-man squad for the 2017 World Cup. In 2018, Eichner joined the Junee Diesels in the Group 9 Rugby League, playing alongside fellow U.S.A. representative Tui Samoa.

In August 2019, Eichner made his debut for the Northern Pride in the Intrust Super Cup.

References

External links
RLWC profile

1991 births
Living people
American rugby league players
Jacksonville Axemen players
New York Freedom Rugby League players
Northern Pride RLFC players
People from Seminole County, Florida
Rugby league second-rows
Toronto Wolfpack players
United States national rugby league team players